FC Zenit Penza is a Russian football team from Penza. It played professionally in 1948–1949, 1961–1973, 1990–1999, 2002–2008, 2010–2017 and from 2021. It played on the second-highest level in the Soviet First League in 1948–1949 and 1960–1962, where its best result was 8th place in Zone 3 in 1961. In 2009, it played in the Amateur Football League which it won and was promoted to the Russian Second Division for 2010. It dropped out the third-tier PFL during the winter break of the 2017–18 season. It re-entered the third tier for the 2021–22 season.

Current squad
As of 21 February 2023, according to the Second League website.

Team name history
1918–1926: KLS Penza (Klub Lyubiteley Sporta – Sport Lovers Club)
1927: Rabochiy Klub Penza
1927–1929: Zavod N50 Penza
1930–1935: ZIF Penza
1936–1947: FC Zenit Penza
1948–1959: FC Spartak Penza
1960–1963: FC Zarya Penza
1964–1965: FC Trud Penza
1966: FC Velozavodets Penza
1967–1971: FC Khimmashevets Penza
1972–1973: FC Sura Penza
1973–1978: FC Granit Penza
1979: FC SKA Penza
1980–1991: FC Granit Penza
1992–present: FC Zenit Penza

References

External links
 Team history at KLISF

Association football clubs established in 1918
Football clubs in Russia
Sport in Penza
1918 establishments in Russia